The Home Computer Advanced Course 1 was a partwork magazine published by Orbis Publishing in the United Kingdom during 1984 and 1985, providing a comprehensive introduction to computing and computer technology for home computer users. It ran for 96 weekly issues, succeeding the previous 24-part publication, The Home Computer Course.

Each issue contained articles on various topics. Subjects included computer applications, computer hardware and software technology, concepts in computer science, practical electronics projects, BASIC and machine code programming, other programming languages, operating systems (including MS-DOS and UNIX), and a jargon dictionary.

See also
Input Magazine

References

Defunct computer magazines published in the United Kingdom
Magazines established in 1984
Magazines disestablished in 1985
Magazines published in London
Partworks
Weekly magazines published in the United Kingdom